Fannegusha Creek is a stream in Carroll and Holmes counties in east-central Mississippi. It is a tributary to the Blissdale Swamp.

The stream flows to the southwest into Holmes County passing under Mississippi Highway 17 and Mississippi Highway 12 north and northeast of Lexington. It is channelized as it enters the Blissdale Swamp within the Hillside National Wildlife Sanctuary 3.5 miles southeast of Tchula and one mile northwest of the community of Howard.

Fannegusha is a name derived from the Choctaw language purported to mean "tasty squirrel". Variant names for Fannegusha Creek are "Foney Bush Creek", "Funnegusha Creek", and "Funnigusha Creek".

References

Rivers of Mississippi
Rivers of Holmes County, Mississippi
Rivers of Carroll County, Mississippi
Mississippi placenames of Native American origin